Jake McCabe (born October 12, 1993) is an American professional ice hockey defenseman for the Toronto Maple Leafs of the National Hockey League (NHL). He was drafted by the Buffalo Sabres in the second round (44th overall) of the 2012 NHL Entry Draft. He has also played for the Chicago Blackhawks.

Youth career

Collegiate 
McCabe played his high school hockey at Eau Claire Memorial, before going to play college hockey at Wisconsin where he spent three seasons playing for the Wisconsin Badgers in the NCAA Men's Division I Big Ten Conference. In his first year with the Badgers, McCabe suffered a severed tendon in his finger, cutting his season to only 26 games. In his junior year, McCabe's outstanding play was rewarded with a selection to the 2013–14 All-Big Ten First Team.

Professional career

Buffalo Sabres 
On April 2, 2014, the Sabres signed McCabe to a three-year entry-level contract, with the intent of having him join the Sabres' active roster. He made his NHL debut the following day, skating 16:20 with the Sabres in a 2–1 loss to the St. Louis Blues. He recorded his first career NHL goal on October 15, 2015, in a loss to the Florida Panthers.

After playing in nearly all 82 games with the Sabres during the 2015–16 season, McCabe signed a three-year contract extension with the Sabres on June 30, 2016.

On January 7, 2017, McCabe delivered a hit on Patrik Laine of the Winnipeg Jets. Laine suffered a concussion and left the game after the hit but McCabe was not disciplined or fined. McCabe ended the regular season with career highs in assists and points.

During the 2017–18 season, McCabe suffered a thumb and shoulder injury that cut his season short.

Entering the 2019–20 season under new head coach Ralph Krueger, McCabe was named an alternate captain of the Sabres.

Chicago Blackhawks 
On July 28, 2021, McCabe left the Sabres as a free agent and signed a four-year, $16 million deal with the Chicago Blackhawks.

Toronto Maple Leafs 
During the 2022–23 season, on February 27, 2023, McCabe was traded by the rebuilding Blackhawks to the Toronto Maple Leafs, along with Sam Lafferty, and two future conditional picks in exchange for Toronto's conditional first-round pick in 2025, Toronto's second-round pick in 2026, Joey Anderson and Pavel Gogolev.

Personal life
McCabe comes from an athletic family, his cousin is Eric Decker who played in the NFL. He also comes from a hockey playing family; his father played collegiate hockey at the University of Alaska Fairbanks and his brother Andrew played one season at the University of Nebraska-Omaha before transferring to the University of Wisconsin–Eau Claire.

Career statistics

Regular season and playoffs

International

Awards and honors

References

External links
 

1993 births
Living people
AHCA Division I men's ice hockey All-Americans
American men's ice hockey defensemen
Buffalo Sabres draft picks
Buffalo Sabres players
Chicago Blackhawks players
Ice hockey players from Wisconsin
Rochester Americans players
Sportspeople from Eau Claire, Wisconsin
Toronto Maple Leafs players
Wisconsin Badgers men's ice hockey players